Willie King (March 18, 1943 – March 8, 2009) was an American blues guitarist and singer, known for shunning fame and playing at a local bar in Mississippi.

Biography
King was born in Prairie Point, a community in Noxubee County, Mississippi near the Alabama border. Prior to recording, he worked as a sharecropper, moonshine maker and traveling salesman; just a few of his many occupations. Later he became active with the civil rights movement, which inspired him to write socially conscious blues songs. In 1983, he founded the Rural Members Association, a non-profit organization dedicated to promoting the traditional rural skills King had grown up with, which he called 'survival skills,' and helping improve his local community.  In 1997, the Rural Members Association started the annual Freedom Creek blues festival, which has since received international recognition. He began recording in 1999 and his 2000 recordings Freedom Creek and I Am The Blues, were the first of several acclaimed albums.

King performed at national and international festivals but mostly played near his home, most notably as a regular at Bettie's Juke joint in Mississippi. He described his music as "struggling blues" because of its focus on the "injustices in life in the rural South".

King died from a heart attack shortly before his 66th birthday, near his home in the rural community of Old Memphis, Alabama, just a few miles from his birthplace.

Willie King on film
Dutch film-makers Saskia Rietmeijer and Bart Drolenga (Visible World Films) wanted to produce a documentary about African American arts and culture in the Deep South. But they met Willie King and instead decided to devote their efforts to creating a documentary about King's life and times, titled Down in the Woods.  King was also featured in Martin Scorsese's 2003 documentary series The Blues and Shout Factory's Blues Story the same year.

Discography

Albums

Videos

Awards
Alabama Folk Heritage Award (awarded posthoumously) 2009
Howlin' Wolf Hall of Fame Inducted September 2, 2005
Alabama State Council on the Arts 2004 Artist Fellowship
Living Blues 2003 Blues Artist of the Year, Best Song, Best Cover Art
Living Blues 2001 Best Blues Artist
Living Blues 2000 Best Blues Album, Best Contemporary Blues Album

See also
Rooster Blues

References

External links
Obituary which aired on Alabama Public Radio
News story at tuscaloosanews.com
Willie King homepage
The Blues Foundation

1943 births
2009 deaths
American blues guitarists
American male guitarists
Guitarists from Mississippi
20th-century American guitarists
20th-century American male musicians